The Battle of Meritsa or Battle of Oxyneia (Μάχη της Οξύνειας) was fought on 11–12 February 1943 between some 800 men of the Greek People's Liberation Army (ELAS), under Nestoras Vokas (nom de guerre "Tzavellas"), Nikos Zaralis ("Chasiotis"), and Ilias Kafantaris ("Adamantios") against a Royal Italian Army battalion. It was fought at the village of Meritsa (modern Oxyneia) near Kalambaka. In the battle, 137 Italians were killed, and 160 were taken prisoner, along with their entire equipment, including 4 mortars, 20 automatic weapons, and over 2,000 grenades. The partisans released their prisoners, but kept the equipment.

References

Sources
 
 
 

Meritsa
Meritsa
Meritsa
Meritsa
February 1943 events
1943 in Greece
Italian occupation of Greece during World War II